The 2009 Irish Greyhound Derby took place during August and September with the final being held at Shelbourne Park in Dublin on 12 September 2009.

The winner College Causeway won €175,000 and was trained by Pat Buckley, owned by the Mike & Vincent McKenna and bred by Frank Culloty. The race was sponsored by the Paddy Power.

Final result 
At Shelbourne, 12 September (over 550 yards):

Distances 
1½, 1¼, 2½, 1¾, 2¼, short-head (lengths)

Competition Report
College Causeway (a 2008 semi-finalist) broke the track record setting a new mark of 29.21 in the first round and is cut from 16-1 to 8-1 to win the competition.  Defending champion Shelbourne Aston went out in round two. The challenge of Scottish Greyhound Derby winner Cabra Cool ended in round two and Champion stakes winner Fatboyz Nodrog was eliminated in round three but Easter Cup champion Droopys Joel made it to the quarter finals.

Three of the quarter finals were won by Royal Tornado, Cashen Legend and Oran Classic with Droopys Noel managing only fourth. College Causeway continued his winning ways and securing a fourth successive victory in 29.47, the best of the round.

In the semi-finals College Causeway beat Shaneboy Lee and Oran Classic; Slip the Lark was eliminated as was Mid West Blue who went out at the same stage as he did the previous year. Cashen Legend defeated Faypoint Man and Belvedere Champ in the second semi-final in a time of 29.87.

When the traps opened in the final Oran Classic from trap two forged out a good lead by halfway, Cashen Legend was prominent but College Causeway was positioned last out of the second bend before slipping inside some of the field by halfway. Oran Classic had a good lead but by the fourth bend College Causeway was making ground. College Causeway went passed Oran Classic on the run-in to complete an unbeaten campaign. Buckley dominated throughout the derby having 5 of the 8 heat winners in the 3rd round while College Causeway remained unbeaten throughout the derby and broke the track record in the opening round.

Quarter finals

Semi finals

See also
2009 UK & Ireland Greyhound Racing Year

References

Greyhound Derby
Irish Greyhound Derby
Irish Greyhound Derby
Irish Greyhound Derby, 2009